Ezio Della Savia (24 June 1942 – 5 September 2021) was an Italian swimmer. He competed at the 1960 Summer Olympics in the 100 m freestyle and at the 1964 Summer Olympics in the 200 m backstroke, but failed to reach the finals. He died in September 2021, at the age of 79.

References

External links
 
 
 

1942 births
2021 deaths
Italian male backstroke swimmers
Italian male freestyle swimmers
Olympic swimmers of Italy
Swimmers at the 1960 Summer Olympics
Swimmers at the 1964 Summer Olympics
Mediterranean Games medalists in swimming
Mediterranean Games silver medalists for Italy
Swimmers at the 1967 Mediterranean Games
People from the Province of Gorizia
Sportspeople from Friuli-Venezia Giulia
20th-century Italian people